Il maestro di Vigevano, internationally released as The Teacher from Vigevano, is a 1963 Italian comedy drama film directed by Elio Petri. It is based on the novel with the same name written by Lucio Mastronardi.

Plot   
Maestro Antonio Mombelli teaches in an elementary school in Vigevano. His life drags on between daily miseries, the harassment of the director of the Pereghi school and the demands of his wife Ada, a frustrated and dissatisfied woman with the modest lifestyle that her husband can grant her. Antonio's only friend is the teacher Nanini, eternal alternate.

Antonio is proud to belong to the intellectual class: he considers it a shame for himself and for his family that his wife wants to work in the factory to supplement his income and that his son, pushed by his mother, occasionally hires himself as a boy. His humble lifestyle would suit him very well, were it not for the constant complaints of his wife who repeatedly accused him of the success and wealth of other fellow citizens. But Antonio does not like entrepreneurial initiative: the rapacity and cynical immorality of those whom Ada considers arrived deeply disgust him. And his particular sense of 'dignity' prevents him from coming to terms with the opportunism of most. Antonio abuses his son and wife, as they do not rapport his sense of 'dignity' and affiliate themselves with a working class. 

Despite this, one day, in order to please his wife, Antonio accepts the proposal of Commendatore Bugatti, a local industrialist to whom Ada had asked for a loan, who offers him to pay off the debt by bestowing good and undeserved votes to his son. Only the irruption of the director Pereghi, who catches the teacher in the act, makes him desist from the intention. Antonio's dignity begins to waver. And also his self-esteem as a head of the family, especially since his wife really decides to work as a worker.

But life is hard. And the desperation of his wife - who soon gets tired of living the life of a worker, but at the same time does not want to go back to her former constraints - pushes the teacher to find solutions. All his attempts, however, fail: first he tries to get more money from the Ministry, through a union claim; then, he offers to keep the kids after school. The suicide of his friend Nanini, rejected for the umpteenth time in the qualification exam and humiliated even by the students, gives the coup de grace to Antonio's precarious balance.

Finally determined to escape from the humiliations he experiences in the school environment, especially by Pereghi, and to follow Ada's ambitions, Antonio resolves to listen to the latter: he leaves his job and, with the liquidation, opens a small shoe factory run by his wife and brother-in-law Carlo. But Antonio is denied for this activity; and his sudden success makes him lose all prudence. He does not even have time to enjoy the first fruits, which reveals in vainglory to an undercover spy of the Tax Police that the company is procuring the leather necessary for the manufacture of the shoes through smuggling. His new business immediately goes up in the air. Ada and Carlo soon make up for it, opening another laboratory. But Antonio is totally marginalized; and goes into depression, tormented by nightmares and hallucinations.

Some time later, Antonio decides to go back to teaching: his psychological balance and his health are at stake. To do this, he must take the qualification exam again to re-enter the role; and so he starts studying hard. Eventually he manages to achieve eligibility brilliantly. It is a moment of happiness, but the joy does not last long: from an inscription in a school bathroom, he learns that he is 'cuckold' and since then the thought of his wife's betrayal never leaves him alone. Indeed, Ada cheats on him with Bugatti. Antonio, now prey to jealousy, would like to commit a mistake and, after having tried in vain to get a gun, he follows them and when he sees them enter a motel, he rushes to surprise them armed with a hammer, but they manage to escape. On the way home, however, Ada and her lover have a tragic accident and die. Antonio remains alone, desperate, with his only son.

In the autumn, the school reopens, the usual activities resume and also the harassment of the director. Behind the usual routines there is no longer even the pride of dignity, which previously gave meaning to Antonio's life.

Cast 
Alberto Sordi as Antonio Mombelli
Claire Bloom as  Ada Badalassi
Piero Mazzarella as  Bugatti
Guido Spadea as  Nanini
Eva Magni as  Nanini's widow
Anna Carena as  Drivaldi
Gustavo D'Arpe as  Amiconi

References

External links

1963 films
Italian comedy-drama films
1963 comedy-drama films
Films directed by Elio Petri
Commedia all'italiana
Films scored by Nino Rota
Films about educators
Films produced by Dino De Laurentiis
Films with screenplays by Age & Scarpelli
Films set in Lombardy
1960s Italian-language films
1960s Italian films